Han Kwang-bok (Korean: 한광복) is a North Korean politician who served as Vice Premier. She was born in the 1940s in the North Hamgyong Province, North Korea. She also served as the Minister for the Electronics Industry until she was replaced on 15 October 2012 by Kim Jae-seong.

See also

Government of North Korea
List of elected or appointed female deputy heads of government
Premier of North Korea

References

Living people
Year of birth missing (living people)
People from North Hamgyong
21st-century North Korean women politicians
21st-century North Korean politicians
Government ministers of North Korea
1940s births
Women government ministers of North Korea